Mary Howard de Liagre (May 18, 1913 – June 6, 2009) was an American actress usually credited as Mary Howard.

Howard came from Tulsa, Oklahoma, and took dancing lessons when she was in kindergarten. Among her dancing instructors was Albertina Rasch. She began her entertainment career as a dancer, performing in shows in New York City when she was 14. That talent ran in her family, as two older sisters were in the Ziegfeld Follies.

Howard's first film employment came when she signed a stock contract with Louis B. Mayer. Although she appeared in few films, she used the first six months to have her teeth straightened and the second six months to learn to act.

Howard helped organize the USO in Los Angeles during World War II and toured for returning servicemen.

In 1945, she moved to New York City and married Alfred de Liagre Jr., a theater producer who died in 1987. She was a founding member of Recording for the Blind, and served on the boards of the American Academy of Dramatic Arts, and the Princess Grace Foundation.

Partial filmography
The Great Ziegfeld (1936) as Miss Carlisle (uncredited)
Torture Money (1937, Short, Academy Award for Best Short Subject, Two-reel) as Nurse Barry (uncredited)
All Over Town (1937) as Joan Eldridge
Man-Proof (1938) as First Girl (uncredited)
Paradise for Three (1938) as Showering Woman (uncredited)
Test Pilot (1938) as Movie Leading Lady (uncredited)
Hold That Kiss (1938) as Nurse in Moving Picture (uncredited)
Fast Company (1938) as Leah Brockler
Marie Antoinette (1938) as Olivia (uncredited)
The Shopworn Angel (1938) as Chorus Girl (uncredited)
Love Finds Andy Hardy (1938) as Mrs. Tompkins
Sweethearts (1938) as Chorus Girl (uncredited)
Four Girls in White (1939) as Mary Forbes
Nurse Edith Cavell (1939) as Nurse O'Brien
Abe Lincoln in Illinois (1940) as Ann Rutledge 
The Wild Man of Borneo (1941) as Mary Thompson
Billy the Kid (1941) as Edith Keating
Riders of the Purple Sage (1941) as Jane Withersteen
Swamp Water (1941) as Hannahas
Who Is Hope Schuyler? (1942) as Diane Rossiter
Thru Different Eyes (1942) as Constance Gardner
The Loves of Edgar Allan Poe (1942) as Frances Allan (final film role)

References

External links

 
 Notice of death at Playbill.com
 Alfred de Liagre (husband)'s obituary in The New York Times
 

1913 births
2009 deaths
Actresses from Kansas
American film actresses
American humanitarians
Women humanitarians
Philanthropists from New York (state)
American socialites
People from Independence, Kansas
People from New York City
Activists from New York (state)
20th-century American actresses
20th-century American philanthropists
21st-century American women